Berwind-White Coal Mining Company v. Chicago and Erie Railroad Company, 235 U.S. 371 (1914), was a United States Supreme Court case involving a suit over demurrage of an Erie Railroad car used by Berwind-White Coal Mining Company to transport coal. The Court asserted that the filing of rates with the Interstate Commerce Commission complied with the notice requirements of the Act to Regulate Commerce and the point of reconsignment was clear under the company's usual practice for many years.

References

External links
 

United States Supreme Court cases
United States Supreme Court cases of the White Court
1914 in United States case law
Berwind Corporation
Coal in the United States